Donacaula melinella is a moth in the family Crambidae. It was described by James Brackenridge Clemens in 1860. It is found in North America, where it has been recorded from Ontario, Alabama, Arizona, Arkansas, Connecticut, Delaware, Florida, Georgia, Illinois, Indiana, Kentucky, Louisiana, Maine, Maryland, Massachusetts, Michigan, Mississippi, Nebraska, New Jersey, New York, North Carolina, Pennsylvania, South Carolina, Texas and Virginia.

The length of the forewings is 21–34 mm. The forewings are pale yellow, irrorated (sprinkled) with brown. The hindwings of the males are yellowish white, turning yellowish grey toward the outer margin. The female hindwings are yellowish white throughout. The main flight period is March to August, although adults have been recorded in most months.

References

Moths described in 1860
Schoenobiinae